This is a list of NCAA Men's Division II Ice Hockey Tournament all-time records, updated through the 1999 Tournament.

References

NCAA men's ice hockey championship
NCAA Division II men's ice hockey tournament